The Board of Secondary Education, Odisha (abbreviated BSE) is a board of education for public and private schools under the state government of Odisha, India.

History
The BSE was formed under the Odisha Education Act 1953. The board controls and maintains all the necessary secondary education in the state of Odisha. Under this board various courses are offered to students for different occupations and to prepare the students for university.

Affiliations
The BSE affiliates all state schools, private schools and colleges in the state of Odisha. It also established and manages the Secondary Board High School, Cuttack, as a model high school. This school shares the same campus as BSE's head office at Cuttack.

Examinations
The board conducts final examinations for various state sponsored courses.

 OTET (Odisha Teacher Eligibility Test)
 HSC Examination (High School Certificate Examination)
 CT (Teachers' Certificate Examination)
 C.P.Ed (Certificate course in Physical Education Examination)
 Prathama
 Madhyama
 NRTS (Middle School Scholarship / National Rural Talent Scholarship Examination)

Regional offices
In addition to the central zonal offices in Cuttack, there are 6 branch offices at Bhubaneswar, Balasore, Baripada, Berhampur, Jeypore and Sambalpur. The revenue district under its jurisdiction includes offices situated at Jajpur, Jagatsinghpur, Kendrapara, Dhenkanal, Angul, Puri, Khurda, Nayagarh, Balasore, Bhadrak, Mayurbhanj, Keonjhar, Ganjam, Kandhamal Gajapati, Boudh, Koraput, Nowrangpur, Malkanagir, Rayagada, Sundargarh, Sambalpur, Jharsuguda, Deogarh, Baragarh, Bolangir, Sonepur, Kalahandi and Nuapada.

See also
Department of Higher Education, Odisha
Council of Higher Secondary Education, Odisha

References

External links
 BSE Odisha Books & Syllabus
 Official website of BSE, Odisha

Education in Odisha
Educational institutions established in 1955
Odisha
State agencies of Odisha
1955 establishments in Orissa